Artana is a municipality located in the province of Castellón, Valencian Community, Spain.
According to the 2014 census, the municipality has a population of 1,958 inhabitants.

Notable people
 Bruno Soriano, footballer

References

External links

Municipalities in the Province of Castellón
Plana Baixa